The Albert and Lina Stenger House is a historic house in Columbus, Nebraska. It was built in 1907 for Albert S. Stenger, an immigrant from Alsace, and his second wife, Lina Steiner, who was an immigrant from Switzerland. They lived here with their six children and Stenger's two daughters from his first marriage. The house was designed in the Prairie School style. It remained in the Stenger family until 1948. It has been listed on the National Register of Historic Places since December 27, 2007.

References

		
National Register of Historic Places in Platte County, Nebraska
Prairie School architecture in Nebraska
Houses completed in 1907
1907 establishments in Nebraska